Feed Ontario, formerly Ontario Association of Food Banks (OAFB), is a food bank network in the Canadian province of Ontario.

History

Ontario Association of Food Banks 

Founded in 1992, the OAFB represented 125 food banks, and over 1,100 hunger-relief organizations across the province, including: urban and rural food banks, community kitchens, breakfast clubs and school meal programs, community food centres, emergency shelters, and seniors' facilities. The mission of the Ontario Association of Food Banks was to "strengthen communities by providing food banks with food, resources, and solutions that address both short and long-term food insecurity."

Every year, the OAFB released a research report on hunger and food bank use in Ontario. In 2015, the OAFB Hunger Report revealed:
 358,963 people accessed food banks across Ontario in March 2015, with 120,554 of those clients being children under 18 years of age
 35% increase in senior citizens visiting food banks over the previous year
 49% of food bank clients are single-person households
 90% of food bank clients are either rental or social housing tenants 
 Over 12% of senior citizens fall below Ontario’s Low Income Measure. This number more than doubles to 27% when looking at seniors who also identify as single
 Senior citizens are expected to represent 23% of the population by 2030
 Single person households represent almost 50% of those who visit food banks, an 11% increase over the past 5 years
 The average food bank client spends 70% of their income on rent, leaving very little for all other necessities
 1 in 3 jobs in Ontario is temporary, contract, or part-time. An individual working full-time, at minimum-wage will have an annual income of approximately $21,000, falling well below Ontario’s Low Income Measure

In 2007, the OAFB had been noted for innovative programming by The Globe and Mail and the Toronto Star.

Rebranding 
On 11 February 2019, the organization changed its name to 'Feed Ontario' to better reflect its modern activities that have evolved since the past.

See also
 List of food banks

References

External links 
Official Website of the Ontario Association of Food Banks (OAFB)  (defunct)
Official website of Feed Ontario

Organizations based in Ontario
Organizations established in 1992
Food banks in Canada